Raimo Kauppila (born 29 July 1958) is a Finnish sports shooter. He competed at the 1996 Summer Olympics and the 2000 Summer Olympics.

Career
During his sport career he won nine international medals at European Championships, four individual and five with the Finnish team, all of these in the double trap.

References

Achievements
Individual

External links
 

1958 births
Living people
Finnish male sport shooters
Olympic shooters of Finland
Shooters at the 1996 Summer Olympics
Shooters at the 2000 Summer Olympics
People from Nivala
Sportspeople from North Ostrobothnia
20th-century Finnish people
21st-century Finnish people